Roger Michael Needham  (9 February 1935 – 1 March 2003) was a British computer scientist.

Early life and education
Needham was born in Birmingham, England, the only child of Phyllis Mary, née Baker (c.1904–1976) and Leonard William Needham (c.1905–1973), a university chemistry lecturer. He attended Doncaster Grammar School for Boys in Doncaster (then in the West Riding) going on to St John's College, Cambridge in 1953, and graduating with a BA in 1956 in mathematics and philosophy. His PhD thesis was on applications of digital computers to the automatic classification and retrieval of documents. He worked on a variety of key computing projects in security, operating systems, computer architecture (capability systems) and local area networks.

Career and research
Among his theoretical contributions is the development of the Burrows-Abadi-Needham logic for authentication, generally known as the BAN logic. His Needham–Schroeder (co-invented with Michael Schroeder) security protocol forms the basis of the Kerberos authentication and key exchange system. He also co-designed the TEA and XTEA encryption algorithms. He pioneered the technique of protecting passwords using a one-way hash function.

In 1962 he joined the University of Cambridge's Computer Laboratory, then called the Mathematical Laboratory, becoming Head of Laboratory in 1980. He was made a professor in 1981 and remained with the laboratory until his retirement in 1995. In 1997 he set up Microsoft's UK-based Research Laboratory. He was a founding Fellow of University College, Cambridge, which became Wolfson College.

Needham was a longtime and respected member of the International Association for Cryptologic Research, the IEEE Computer Society Technical Committee on Security and Privacy and the University Grants Committee. He was made a fellow of the Association for Computing Machinery in 1994.

Awards and honours
Needham was elected a Fellow of the Royal Society (FRS) in 1985, and a Fellow of the Royal Academy of Engineering (FREng) in 1993. He was appointed Commander of the Order of the British Empire (CBE) for his contributions to computing in 2001.  Needham held honorary doctorate degrees from University of Twente, Loughborough University, and University of Kent.

Named in Needhams honour
Needham has several awards named after him in his honour. The British Computer Society established an annual Roger Needham Award in 2004.

The European Conference on Computer Systems (EuroSys) established the annual Roger Needham PhD award. It awards €2,000 to a PhD student from a European university whose thesis is regarded to be an exceptional, innovative contribution to knowledge in the computer systems area. Past winners have been:

 2021 Victor van de Veen, (Vrije Universiteit Amsterdam)
 2020 Michael Schwarz, Graz University of Technology for his PhD thesis Software-based Side-Channel Attacks and Defenses in Restricted Environments
 2019 Manolis Karpathiotakis, EPFL
 2018 Dennis Andriesse (Vrije Universiteit Amsterdam) for his PhD thesis Analyzing and Securing Binaries Through Static Disassembly
 2015 Cristiano Giuffrida (Vrije Universiteit Amsterdam) for his PhD thesis  Safe and Automatic Live Update
 2014 Torvald Riegel (Technische Universitaet Dresden), for his thesis  Software Transactional Memory Building Blocks
 2013 Asia Slowinska (Vrije Universiteit Amsterdam) for her PhD thesis Using Information Flow Tracking to Protect Legacy Binaries
 2012 Derek Murray, for his thesis A Distributed Execution Engine Supporting Data-Dependent Control Flow
 2011 Jorrit Herder for  Building a Dependable Operating System: Fault Tolerance in MINIX 3
 2010 Willem de Bruijn (Vrije Universiteit Amsterdam) for  Adaptive Operating System Design for High Throughput I/O
 2009 Jacob Gorm Hansen (DIKU) for Virtual Machine Mobility with Self-Migration
 2008 Adam Dunkels (SICS) for Programming Memory-Constrained Networked Embedded Systems
 2007 Nick Cook (Newcastle University) for  Middleware Support for Non-repudiable Business-to-Business Interactions
 2006 Oliver Heckmann (TU Darmstadt) for  A System-oriented Approach to Efficiency and Quality of Service for Internet Service Providers

Personal life
Needham married fellow computer scientist Karen Spärck Jones in 1958. He died of cancer in March 2003 at his home in Willingham, Cambridgeshire.

References

1935 births
2003 deaths
Academics of the University of Cambridge
Alumni of St John's College, Cambridge
British computer scientists
Commanders of the Order of the British Empire
Fellows of the British Computer Society
Fellows of the Royal Society
Fellows of University College, Cambridge
Fellows of Wolfson College, Cambridge
Fellows of the Association for Computing Machinery
Microsoft employees
Deaths from cancer in England
People from Doncaster
People from South Cambridgeshire District